Vyatskiye Polyany is a town in Kirov Oblast, Russia, located on the right bank of the Vyatka River,  southeast of Kirov. Population:

History
It has been known since 1596. A railway passed through it in 1915. Urban-type settlement status was granted to it in 1938 and town status—in 1942.

Administrative and municipal status
Within the framework of administrative divisions, Vyatskiye Polyany serves as the administrative center of Vyatskopolyansky District, even though it is not a part of it. As an administrative division, it is incorporated separately as the Town of Vyatskiye Polyany—an administrative unit with the status equal to that of the districts. As a municipal division, the Town of Vyatskiye Polyany is incorporated as Vyatskiye Polyany Urban Okrug.

Economy
Vyatskiye Polyany is a town with economy centered on a single enterprise, the Molot factory. The factory was active in machine building and was oriented to the military industry. In 2009, it became unprofitable, and in 2010, it stopped. The salaries were not paid for months. The authorities initiated the programs of diversification of the industry and of reorientation of the factory.

Population and etnicitys

References

Notes

Sources

Cities and towns in Kirov Oblast
Vyatka Governorate
Monotowns in Russia